Ashtown Burials is a young adult fantasy series by N. D. Wilson. It consists of three published novels: The Dragon's Tooth (2011), The Drowned Vault (2012), and Empire of Bones (2013), as well as a fourth book, The Silent Bells, which as of 2021 is being published in serial format.

The series follow Cyrus Smith, who – along with his sister Antigone – is a member of the Order of Brendan, a secret organization that is under threat from transmortals, characters from history who have become immortal.

Marilyn E. Burton notes that in this series, "character of myth and legend from every culture and era populate our world." This makes us "reconsider the boundary lines between story and history, fact and fable." Jeremy Larson calls the series a "mythological and historical bricolage".

References

External links
 

Novels by N. D. Wilson
American young adult novels
American fantasy novel series
Young adult fantasy novels